Scelophoromyces is a genus of fungi in the family Laboulbeniaceae. A monotypic genus, it contains the single species Scelophoromyces osorianus.

References

External links
Scelophoromyces at Index Fungorum

Laboulbeniomycetes
Monotypic Laboulbeniomycetes genera